Crash Bandicoot 2: Cortex Strikes Back is a 1997 platform video game developed by Naughty Dog and published by Sony Computer Entertainment for the PlayStation. It is a sequel to Crash Bandicoot (1996), and is part of the Crash Bandicoot series.

Taking place on a fictional group of islands near Australia, Crash Bandicoot 2 follows the adventures of the anthropomorphic bandicoot named Crash. Crash is abducted by series villain Doctor Neo Cortex, who tricks him into thinking he wants to save the world. Crash is thrust into several parts of N. Sanity Island in order to gather crystals that will allow Cortex to contain the power of an upcoming planetary alignment and keep the planet from being destroyed. Crash's sister Coco and Cortex's former assistant Doctor Nitrus Brio try to warn him about Cortex, with the latter urging Crash to gather gems instead of crystals.

Cortex Strikes Back received positive reviews from critics and is widely considered to be superior to its predecessor. Much of the praise went to the game's graphics, controls and music, while criticisms focused on the trial-and-error gameplay, lack of level variety, easy boss levels and lack of innovation as a platform game. The game went on to become one of the best-selling PlayStation video games of all time and replaced its predecessor as the highest-selling Western title in Japan at the time, selling more than 800,000 copies in the country by April 1998. A remastered version was included in the Crash Bandicoot N. Sane Trilogy collection, released on the PlayStation 4 in June 2017, and ported to other platforms in June 2018.

Gameplay

Cortex Strikes Back is a platform game in which the player character is the titular Crash Bandicoot. The goal of the game is to gather 25 crystals for Crash's nemesis Doctor Neo Cortex. The crystals are scattered between 25 different levels, accessible via "Warp Rooms", which are hub areas of the game. A level is cleared by collecting its respective crystal and reaching the end of its path, which returns Crash to the Warp Room. Each Warp Room contains five levels. When all five levels are cleared, the player must defeat a boss character before gaining access to the next Warp Room. The player is given a certain amount of lives, which are lost when Crash is attacked by an enemy, or falls into water or a pit. If the player runs out of lives, the game is over. However, it can be continued by selecting "Yes" at the "Continue?" screen.

Crash has the ability to jump into the air and land on an enemy character, spin in a tornado-like fashion to knock enemies off-screen, slide across the ground, and perform a body slam to break certain objects. Crash can jump higher than he normally can if he jumps immediately following a slide. All of these techniques can be used as offensive measures against most enemies, who serve to deter Crash's progress. Enemies with deadly topsides cannot be jumped on, while enemies that attack from the front or have side spikes must be jumped on or undergo a body slam. Enemies with sharp necklines (such as frill-necked lizards or long-legged robots with heated circumferences) can only be defeated if Crash slides into them.

Boxes play a prominent role in Cortex Strikes Back and can be broken with all of Crash's techniques. Most boxes in the game contain "Wumpa Fruit", which give the player an extra life if 100 of them are collected. Some boxes contain a Witch Doctor's Mask, which shields Crash from one enemy's attack while it is in his possession. If three masks are collected in a row, Crash is given temporary invulnerability from all minor dangers. If jumped upon, boxes with arrows pointing up propel Crash further into the air than he can ordinarily reach, and such boxes can be broken only with Crash's spin attack. Boxes with an exclamation mark (!) on them cause previously intangible objects in the area to solidify. TNT Boxes explode after a three-second fuse when jumped on, while Nitro Boxes explode upon any physical contact. All of the Nitro Boxes in a level can be detonated at once if a green-colored box with an exclamation mark (!) on it is touched. Checkpoint boxes allow Crash to return to the point where the first checkpoint box has been opened upon losing a life. If more than one checkpoint box has been opened in a stage, Crash returns to the last checkpoint box that has been opened. The player will earn a gem if they manage to destroy all the boxes, including Nitro Boxes and boxes on alternate routes, in a level. Certain gems can be acquired by other means, like reaching the end of a level within a certain time parameter, or completing a level without breaking any boxes.

"Bonus Paths", signified by platforms with a question mark on them, lead Crash to a secret region of the level. In these areas, numerous Wumpa Fruit and extra lives can be collected if the player successfully navigates to the end of the path. If Crash falls off-screen or is otherwise killed off, the player loses whatever was collected in the Bonus Path and is returned to the level from which the Bonus Path was accessed, keeping all lives the player had previously collected.

Plot
Crash Bandicoot sends Doctor Neo Cortex falling from his airship into a cavern filled with glowing crystals. Convinced that they hold tremendous power, he takes one and gets back onto his laboratory. One year later, Cortex and his new assistant Dr. N. Gin rebuild an upgraded, crystal-powered Cortex Vortex in outer space; N. Gin says that they need 25 more crystals to reach the Vortex's maximum capacity and they do not have any of their operatives left on Earth. Cortex then devises a plot to manipulate Crash into retrieving the crystals for him.

Meanwhile, Crash's younger sister, Coco, has him retrieve a new battery for her laptop, but Crash is abducted. Finding himself in an ancient Warp Room that has access to several places all over the world, Crash meets Cortex via his holographic projection. Cortex tells Crash that he discovered that the upcoming alignment of the planets will create a solar flux capable of catastrophic proportions and urges Crash to retrieve pink power crystals through each of the Room's doors to help Cortex harness the crystal's energy to dissipate the massive power unleashed. Unbeknownst to Cortex, his former assistant Dr. Nitrus Brio also appears in hologram form and tells Crash that, scattered across the world, there are several clear and colored gems that serve as an alternative form of energy that Brio is planning to use against Cortex. However, Brio also warns Crash that he will use his forces to prevent Crash from collecting more crystals. As such, while collecting crystals, Crash battles Brio's mutant allies: the demented Ripper Roo, the scimitar-wielding Komodo Brothers and the ravenous Tiny Tiger.

Meanwhile, Coco uses her technology expertise to hack into Cortex's hologram communication to advise Crash to be careful trusting Cortex. Cortex eventually tells Crash to return the crystals he collected to his current assistant, N. Gin, but when Crash destroys N. Gin's mechasuit and defeats him, Cortex gets furious. After gathering all 25 crystals, Coco manages to hold a steady connection to reveal Cortex's ultimate plan; with the energy harnessed from the planetary alignment, Cortex will power the gigantic Cortex Vortex built onto his space station and brainwash everyone on Earth into serving his army. Crash reaches Cortex in outer space and incapacitates him once again before the crystals can be used, leaving him drifting through outer space, but leaves the Cortex Vortex intact. However, with Dr. Brio's aid, Crash uses all the gems he gathered throughout the Warp Room and learns that Brio built a laser beam machine powered by the gem's energy. With Crash's help, the laser beam breaks the Cortex Vortex apart, with one of the pieces falling back to Earth.

Development
Production of Cortex Strikes Back began in October 1996. Development took place over the course of 13 months on a budget of $2,000,000. The concept art for the game's environments was mainly created by Naughty Dog employees Bob Rafei, Eric Iwasaki, Erick Pangilinan, Charlotte Francis and Jason Rubin. The jungle levels were originally to have featured ground fog, but this was abandoned when magazines and the public began to criticize other developers for using fog to hide polygon count. Sunlight and depth accentuation was experimented with for these levels. Naughty Dog created the sewer levels as a way to work some "dirty" locations in the game. Color contrast was added to the levels to show depth and break up the monotony of sewer pipes. The character of Coco Bandicoot was created by Naughty Dog as a counterbalance to Tawna (Crash's girlfriend in the first game) that would appease Sony Computer Entertainment Japan, who were uncomfortable with a "super sexy" character being alongside Crash. Character designer Charles Zembillas drew the first sketches of Coco on March 18, 1997.

For the game, Crash Bandicoot co-creator Andy Gavin programmed a new engine named "Game-Oriented Object LISP 2" (GOOL 2); being three times faster than the previous game's engine, it could handle ten times the animation frames and twice the polygon count. A flat plane z-buffer was created for the game; because the water surfaces and mud in the jungle had to be a flat plane and be exactly flat on the Y-axis, there could be no waves and the subdividing plane could not be at an odd angle. The effect only worked on objects in the foreground and was only used on Crash, some enemies and a few boxes at the same time.

The soundtrack of Cortex Strikes Back was written by Josh Mancell from Mutato Muzika, while the sound effects were created by Universal Sound Studios (consisting of Mike Gollom, Ron Horwitz and Kevin Spears). The characters were designed by Charles Zembillas of American Exitus, Incorporated. Clancy Brown provided the voice of Doctor Neo Cortex, Vicki Winters voiced Coco Bandicoot, and Brendan O'Brien voiced Crash Bandicoot, Doctor N. Gin, and Doctor Nitrus Brio. The game was unveiled at the Electronic Entertainment Expo in Atlanta, Georgia in June 1997 to a positive response from the game industry.

The game went into the alpha stage in August 1997. Around that time, Dan Arey, the lead designer of Gex: Enter the Gecko, joined Naughty Dog and streamlined the level design. A "Dynamic Difficulty Adjustment" system was added, which would adjust elements of the game in response to player activity to balance difficulty. IGDA considers the testing process for Crash Bandicoot 2 the moment where the field of Games User Research "came of age".

A death animation in which Crash is squashed into a stunned head and feet was altered for the Japanese version of the game due to its resemblance to the severed head and shoes left by a serial killer loose in Japan at the time.<ref name="AndyGavin2">{{cite web |url=http://all-things-andy-gavin.com/2011/02/06/making-crash-bandicoot-part-5/ |title=Making Crash Bandicoot - part 5 |author=Andy Gavin |date=February 6, 2011 |publisher=All Things Andy Gavin |access-date=February 7, 2011 |quote=Naughty Dog would do a huge amount of work after this on the game for Japan, and even then we would always release a Japanese specific build. Whether it was giving Aku Aku pop up text instructions, or replace a Crash smashing "death" that reminded them of the severed head and shoes left by a serial killer that was loose in Japan during Crash 2'''s release, we focused on Japan and fought hard for acceptance and success. |archive-url=https://web.archive.org/web/20110707112653/http://all-things-andy-gavin.com/2011/02/06/making-crash-bandicoot-part-5/ |archive-date=July 7, 2011 |url-status=live}}</ref>

ReceptionCrash Bandicoot 2: Cortex Strikes Back was released to critical acclaim. Major Mike of GamePro said that while the fundamental gameplay mechanics were the same as the first title, "its graphical enhancements and added moves catapult it to the top of the PlayStation action/platform heap." He gave it a 4.5 out of 5 in both control and fun factor, and a perfect 5.0 in both graphics and sound. John Broady of GameSpot considered the game to be superior to its predecessor, commenting positively on the Warp Room concept, improved game-saving system and variety of the levels. Of the four reviewers in Electronic Gaming Monthlys review team, Shawn Smith and Kraig Kujawa hailed it as an outstanding sequel, citing its advanced graphics and heavy challenge, while Dan Hsu and Kelly Rickards said it is an excellent game but overly similar to the original. The staff of IGN praised the "spot on" control and noted the decreased linearity of the game and increased intuition of the bonus levels compared to the first game. Mark Cooke of Game Revolution described the game as "undeniably fun". Next Generation stated that "Crash 2 is a tempting gameplay treat, one that frustrates at times, but it always rewards a job well done – and that is an addictive combination for any serious platform gamer. Recommended."

The game's graphics were positively received. Major Mike considered the graphics to be "a quantum leap" over its predecessor, and cited Crash's detailed animations and level effects such as reflective ice surfaces as highlights. GameSpot's Broady described them as "in a league of their own among PlayStation games", while the IGN staff praised the high-resolution graphics as "beautiful". Shawn Smith of Electronic Gaming Monthly praised the colorfulness, lack of breakup, animation, reflections, and lighting effects, as well as the texture morphing when Crash burrows. Game Revolution's Mark Cooke noted the absence of cutscenes brought about by the entirety of the game being "rendered on the fly beautifully" and that the game could "really set some new standards in Playstation graphic quality." He went on to describe the animation as "flawless" and of "cartoon quality" and added that the game's "creatures, environments, and story building scenes are absolutely perfect." The game's audio was also well-received; Broady simply stated that the music "couldn't be better", while Cooke said that Clancy Brown's "hilarious satirical" performance as Doctor Neo Cortex added to the game's cartoonish quality. Major Mike also singled out Brown's performance for commendation, and remarked that the music, which he felt was "perfect for every stage", "sounds like a cross between the Pulp Fiction soundtrack and the B-52s".

Minor criticisms varied amongst critics. Broady noted that the semi-3D setup is "sometimes hard to navigate" and elaborated that "you'll find yourself missing jumps because you're unable to judge distances properly." Additionally, he criticized the trial-and-error aspect of the gameplay as "just plain cheap" and stated that "in some areas you must sacrifice many lives until you memorize a level's layout." Smith and Rickards both said that while the control works well with the analog pad, it is somewhat loose with the digital gamepad, which was still the standard for the PlayStation. Contrarily, Major Mike contended that the digital pad "works just as well, if not better." The IGN staff said that the level design "isn't as varied as it could be" and added that the "jungle, snow and water" environments are recycled from the previous game and reused multiple times in Cortex Strikes Back. They also described the boss levels as "insultingly easy". Major Mike similarly commented "Although [the bosses] look awesome, they have easy-to-recognize patterns and present no challenge." Cooke observed that, like its predecessor, the game did not add anything to the genre and summarized that "the first Crash was dauntingly similar to the 16-bit platform games of yester-yore, only with better graphics, and Crash 2 doesn't deviate much from this formula". He also described the "bizarre" lenticular 3D cover art of the game as "unnecessary and evil" and "a device of unprecedented agony", claiming to have contracted a massive headache after "looking at it in [his] car for about 15 seconds".Crash Bandicoot 2 was a commercial hit. By late February 1998, its sales has reached 1 million units in the United States, 800,000 units in Japan, and 340,000 units in Europe. By February 1999, 4.08 million copies of Crash Bandicoot had been shipped to retailers worldwide; the NPD Group reported sell-through of 1.49 million copies in North America alone. By December 2007, Cortex Strikes Back had sold 3.78 million units in the United States and 1.3 million in Japan. This makes it one of the best-selling PlayStation video games of all time. The game's success resulted in its re-release for the Sony Greatest Hits lineup on August 30, 1998, and for the Platinum Range in 1999. The game replaced Crash Bandicoot as the highest-selling non-Japanese title in Japan, selling over 800,000 copies by April 1998. Cortex Strikes Back was initially released on the European PlayStation Network on July 26, 2007, but was withdrawn on August 7, 2007, along with Spyro 2: Ripto's Rage/Gateway to Glimmer and MediEvil'', as a precautionary measure when the latter two games experienced technical problems. The game was released on the North American PlayStation Network on January 10, 2008, and re-released on the European PlayStation Network on February 2, 2011.

References

Bibliography

External links

 

1997 video games
Crash Bandicoot games
Naughty Dog games
3D platform games
PlayStation (console) games
PlayStation Network games
Single-player video games
Sony Interactive Entertainment games
Universal Interactive games
Video game sequels
Video games scored by Josh Mancell
Video games set in Australia
Video games set on fictional islands
Video games developed in the United States